Puerto Rico Highway 28 (PR-28)  is a road that extends from Bayamón, Puerto Rico to the Port of San Juan. This highway extends from Expreso Río Hondo (PR-5) to Expreso Kennedy (PR-2) and it is known as Avenida Francisco José de Goya.

Major intersections

See also

 List of highways numbered 28

References

External links
 

028